The K'Ho, Cơ Ho, or Koho are an ethnic group living in the Lâm Đồng province of Vietnam's Central Highlands. They speak K'Ho language, a southern Bahnaric branch of Mon–Khmer language. They are related to the Cho Ro and Mạ people.

The Lạch people, a subgroup of K'Ho, is the indigenous group of Lâm Đồng. The name of the city of Da Lat (Lâm Đồng's capital) originated from Đà Lạch (literally "river of the Lạch people").

Culture
They have a musical instrument called kăm boat and the dish sour gruel.

K'ho people's folk religion worships a pantheon of gods, including Yang N'Du, the Supreme God, forest god, water god, fire god... The majority of the Koho people now identify as Christian. 

K'ho people also boast rich vernacular literature, such as the Epic of Gơ Plom kòn Yồi (literally "The child of Plom is Yồi").

Subdivisions
According to Ngọc (2010:11), subdivisions of the Cơ-Ho include the following tribes.
Srê
Nộp
C'don
Cil
Lach
T'ring

Đưng K'nớ commune, Lạc Dương district, Lâm Đồng province has the following subdivisions (clans) (Ngọc 2010:14).
Bon Dơng
Rơ Ông
K'Long
Kơ Liêng
Krajan
Pang Ting
Da-gout
Bon Niêng
Cil
Liêng Hót
Phi Srônh
M'bon
Kơ Să
Đơng G
Bon Đing

References

Ngọc Lý Hiển. 2010. Nghề dệt vải của người Cơ-Ho Chil. Hà Nội: Nhà xuất bản văn hóa thông tin.

Ethnic groups in Vietnam